Cemetery Dance is a thriller novel by Douglas Preston and Lincoln Child released on May 12, 2009 by Grand Central Publishing. This is the ninth installment in the Special Agent Pendergast series. During production, it was known by the pre-release title Revenant.  The preceding novel is The Wheel of Darkness.

Plot
After celebrating their first anniversary, William Smithback, a reporter for The New York Times, and his wife Nora Kelly, a Museum of Natural History archeologist, return home from a romantic dinner.  Kelly slips out to pick up a pastry from the local shop, but upon her return to their apartment in the Upper West side of Manhattan, she finds the door ajar, Smithback dead, and is attacked as she approaches.

Eyewitnesses claim, and the security camera confirms, the attacker seen leaving the building was an individual who lived in the apartment building along with Smithback and Kelly. The twist: the man that witnesses believe is Smithback's murderer was pulled from the river dead, after committing suicide, two weeks before the attack. D'Agosta, a homicide detective, leads the official investigation, while FBI Special Agent Aloysius Pendergast's and Kelly's involvement leads to a less traditional quest for the truth. Their serpentine journey takes them into a part of Manhattan they never imagined could exist: a secretive and deadly hotbed of Obeah, the West Indian Zombi cult of sorcery and magic. Unfortunately many others learn of the cult, thus endangering themselves and countless innocent lives.

References

External links
Official website
SF Site: A review by John Enzinas
Review – "Cemetery Dance" by Douglas Preston & Lincoln Child

American thriller novels
Novels by Douglas Preston
Novels by Lincoln Child
Collaborative novels
Sequel novels
Techno-thriller novels
2009 American novels
Novels set in New York City
Grand Central Publishing books